Darío Gabriel Cabrol (born January 31, 1972 in Santa Fe) is a former Argentine football midfielder who played professionally in Argentina, France, Chile, Bolivia and Ecuador during the 1990s through 2007.

Club career
Cabrol began his career in 1990 with his hometown club Unión de Santa Fe. In 1992, he was loaned to Racing Club, before joining Lanús a year later. In 1994, Cabrol went back to Unión to find the club competing in the Primera B Nacional. With his help, the team won the promotion in 1996 and returned to first division after two years. He played there for four more seasons. During his two periods at Unión, Cabrol earned a total of 197 league appearances and 40 goals scored in the Primera División Argentina.

In 2000, he awoke the interest of French team Toulouse FC, which ultimately acquired his rights. However, during his time in Ligue 1 he made most of his appearances coming off the bench. After a disappointing stint in Europe, he returned to Argentina and signed with Unión's biggest rival, Colón. Six months later, he transferred to Atlético Tucumán where he had a successful season. His tuned-up performance rewarded him with a transfer to Universidad de Chile. In 2003 Cabrol made his last run in the Argentine first division with Huracán before moving to Ecuador to join Emelec.

In 2004, he had a spell with Bolivian team Blooming, but left the club only after a couple of months as he didn't live up to the expectations. Back in his country, he joined Ben Hur and played there until late 2005. In the sunset of his career, Cabrol decided to try his luck at Argentino de Rosario, hoping to have a successful season and consequently get a call from senior clubs Newell's or Central. However, he never got that offer and finished his career playing in the Torneo Argentino B with Gimnasia y Esgrima de Santa Fe.

Club titles

References

External links
 Argentine Primera statistics

1972 births
Living people
Footballers from Santa Fe, Argentina
Association football midfielders
Argentine footballers
Unión de Santa Fe footballers
Racing Club de Avellaneda footballers
Club Atlético Lanús footballers
Toulouse FC players
Universidad de Chile footballers
Club Atlético Colón footballers
Atlético Tucumán footballers
Argentine expatriate sportspeople in Ecuador
Club Atlético Huracán footballers
C.S. Emelec footballers
Club Blooming players
Argentine Primera División players
Expatriate footballers in France
Expatriate footballers in Chile
Expatriate footballers in Ecuador
Argentine expatriate sportspeople in Chile
Expatriate footballers in Bolivia
Argentine expatriate footballers
Argentine expatriate sportspeople in Bolivia
Argentine expatriate sportspeople in France
Argentino de Rosario footballers